The Petic is a left tributary of the river Zăbala in Romania. It flows into the Zăbala near Năruja.

References

Rivers of Romania
Rivers of Vrancea County